Preaching to the Choir is a 2006 American musical comedy-drama film directed by Charles Randolph-Wright and starring Billoah Greene, Darien Sills-Evans, Novella Nelson, Janine Green, Rosa Arredondo, Eartha Kitt, Tichina Arnold and Adewale Akinnuoye-Agbaje.

Cast
Billoah Greene as Teshawn 
Darien Sills-Evans as Wesley
Adewale Akinnuoye-Agbaje as Bull Sharky
Janine Green as Kia
Novella Nelson as Aunt June
Tuffy Questell as Stumpy
Eartha Kitt as Sister Nettie
Patti LaBelle as Sister Jasmine
Rosa Arredondo as Rachel
Tichina Arnold as Desiree
Tim Reid as Prophet

Release
The film was released on April 14, 2006.

Reception
The film has a 36% rating on Rotten Tomatoes based on fourteen reviews.

John Anderson of Variety gave the film a positive review and wrote, "Despite the ungainly script and direction, the climactic performances — including one by young singer Anny Jules –absolve the movie of most of its sins."

Bruce Westbrook of the Houston Chronicle also gave the film a positive review and wrote, "Nor does it sermonize at the expense of entertaining. Instead, it melds gospel and hip-hop for a music-driven tale of twin brothers who reconnect."

References

External links
 
 

2000s English-language films